The Politics of Experience and The Bird of Paradise is a 1967 book by the Scottish psychiatrist R. D. Laing. The book comprises two parts - the first a collection of seven articles previously published between 1962 and 1965; the second a free-flowing quasi-autobiographical piece of poetry and prose.

Background
The Politics of Experience and The Bird of Paradise was inspired in part by Laing’s extensive experimentation with LSD; but also owes a debt to authors such as the anthropologist Gregory Bateson and the philosopher Jean-Paul Sartre.

Summary
Laing examines the nature of human experience from a phenomenological point of view, as well as the possibilities for psychotherapy in an existentially distorted world.  He challenges the idea of normality in modern society, and argues that it is not merely people who are mad, but the world as well. He presents psychosis as "a psychedelic voyage of discovery in which the boundaries of perception were widened, and consciousness expanded".

While accepting in principle that “There is no need to idealize someone just because he is labelled 'out of formation'” (or mad), Laing tended to confirm a view of the mad as explorers of the inner world.

Influence
The Politics of Experience is Laing's best-known book, its literary influence being especially apparent in Doris Lessing's novel, Briefing for a Descent into Hell (1971).

See also

References

1967 non-fiction books
Anti-psychiatry books
Books by R. D. Laing
English-language books
English non-fiction books
Penguin Books books